Mchadi is a traditional Georgian cornbread traditionally eaten with lobio and cheese.

References

Cuisine of Georgia (country)
Maize dishes
Breads